Chlidichthys auratus, the golden dottyback, is a species of fish in the family Pseudochromidae.

Description

Distribution and habitat
Chlidichthys auratus is from the Red Sea.

References

Goren, M. and M. Dor, 1994. An updated checklist of the fishes of the Red Sea (CLOFRES II). The Israel Academy of Sciences and Humanities, Jerusalem, Israel. 120 p.

Pseudoplesiopinae
Taxa named by Roger Lubbock
Fish described in 1975